WaterCar is an American company that specializes in the manufacture and development of luxury amphibious vehicles. Based in Southern California, the company was founded by Dave March in 1999 when he was inspired by the Amphicar of the 1960s. March claims he originally had no plans to market an amphibious vehicle — just merely to build one. The company holds 27 amphibious related patents as well as the Guinness World Record for the fastest amphibious vehicle. WaterCar vehicles are designed and manufactured at Fountain Valley BodyWorks, an  collision repair auto body shop in Southern California, owned and operated by March.

History 
Between 1999 and 2010, WaterCar developed three amphibious prototypes. One of these prototypes was the Python. Due to the high cost of vehicle production, the Python was never developed past the prototype phase.

In 2011, March began developing a more reliable amphibious vehicle using technology from the Python and other prototypes. In June 2013, he released the Panther, the first commercial vehicle developed by WaterCar. Since its release, WaterCar has been popular in the Middle East, selling to the Embassy of the United Arab Emirates, with six additional vehicles being sold to the Crown Prince of Dubai and others sold to tech enthusiasts and residents of Silicon Valley. The Python's price is US$140,000 (initially US$135,000).

The trip took 70 minutes, and he completed the drive on an estimated  of gasoline, a little more than half the total capacity of the Water Car's 25 gallon tank.

March was not the first to drive an amphibious car to an island; the first was Howard Singer of La Jolla who on Aug. 19, 1978, became the first person to drive an amphibious car from Long Beach to Santa Catalina Island. He left from the Long Beach Navy Pier at 7:30 a.m. driving an "Amphicar" and arrived at Avalon at about 3:15 p.m.

Technology 
The WaterCar Panther is powered with a rear-mounted Honda Acura 3.7-liter engine, and a "Panther"-Jet boat drive engine. The vehicle can transition from land to sea and vice versa in under fifteen seconds, and has a hydraulic off-road suspension that retracts the wheels in less than eight seconds. This allows the Panther to drive into the water at 15 mph. Once in the water, the driver puts the vehicle in neutral, pulls a handle that switches the transfer case over to jet drive, pushes a lever to hydraulically lift the wheels and tires out of the water, and begins operating the vehicle just like a boat. The process is reversed when going from water to land.

Each vehicle employs a lightweight chassis made of chromoly steel (an alloy of chromium and molybdenum) that fits into a fiberglass hull. This development model allows for the light weight needed for an amphibious vehicle. The interior is made of road suspension seats as well as US Coast Guard approved closed-cell Styrofoam.

In the media 
In 2014, the WaterCar Panther was featured in ABC's reality television series The Bachelor (S18, E06). The WaterCar has also been featured in USA Network's television series Royal Pains (S05, E15 • A Trismus Story) and on the CNBC episode Just Add Water (S02, E11 • Nov. 30, 2016) of Jay Leno's Garage.

See also 
 Amphicar
 Water Car in Dubai

References

External links 
 
 Fountain Valley Bodyworks

Companies based in California
Car manufacturers of the United States
Boat builders